Recchi is an Italian surname. Notable people with the surname include:

Angelo Recchi (born 1951), Italian footballer
Giovanni Battista Recchi, 17th-century Italian painter
Giovanni Paolo Recchi, 17th-century Italian painter
Giuseppe Recchi (born 1964), Italian businessman
Mark Recchi (born 1968), Canadian ice hockey player and coach

Italian-language surnames